was a Japanese daimyō of the early Edo period. The son of the second shōgun Tokugawa Hidetada, his elder brother was the third shōgun Tokugawa Iemitsu.

Life 
Often called Suruga Dainagon (the major counsellor of Suruga), Tadanaga was born in 1606. His birth name was Kunichiyo (国千代). The date of his birth is uncertain, and is variously given as May 7, June 1, and December 3. Blessed with military and intellectual prowess and a generosity of spirit, he received support from his mother, Oeyo (or Sūgen'in), who favored him over her other son Takechiyo (the future Iemitsu) to become the third shogun. Just after the death of their father shogun Hidetada, Iemitsu accused his brother, already under house arrest in Kōfu, of insanity, stripped him of all possessions and offices, leaving him to commit seppuku. 

It is also said that Tadanaga's face was similar to that of his cousin Toyotomi Hideyori and for that reason Ieyasu hated and feared Tadanaga.

He married Masahime (1614-1690) later Shoko-in, the daughter of Oda Nobuyoshi, who was the son of Oda Nobunaga.

Events 
 1606: Born to Hidetada and Sūgen'in
 1624: Appointed daimyō of Suruga, Tōtōmi, and Kai Provinces, with a rating of 550,000 koku (see Kōfu Domain)
 1626: Kills a retainer and commits other acts of violence
 1631: Placed under house arrest in Kōfu
 1632: Stripped of office
 1633 (or 1634): Commits seppuku under arrest in Takasaki

See also 
Tokugawa Ieyasu
Tokugawa Hidetada
Suruga Province

References 

1606 births
1633 deaths
Shinpan daimyo
Tokugawa clan
People of Edo-period Japan
Suicides by seppuku